All Men Amen is the second album by English saxophonist Iain Ballamy, featuring Django Bates, Steve Watts and Martin France. It was released on the B&W label in 1995.

Reception
Allmusic awarded the album with 4.5 out of 5 stars.

Track listing
 "All Men Amen" – 7:24 
 "Serendipity" – 5:28 
 "Blennie" – 4:42 
 "Haunted Swing" – 4:30 
 "Oaxaca" – 6:07 
 "Meadow" – 8:48 
 "This World...." – 4:36 
 "Further Away" – 3:35

All compositions by Iain Ballamy

Personnel
Iain Ballamy – soprano, alto and tenor saxophones 
Django Bates – keyboards, tenor horn
Steve Watts – bass
Martin France – drums

References

1995 albums
Iain Ballamy albums